Daniel Teva Zaveroni (born 10 October 1975) in Tahiti is a footballer who plays as a midfielder. He previously played for AS Taravao and AS Pirae. He currently plays for AS Pirae in the Tahiti Division Fédérale and the Tahiti national football team.

In October 2013 he was appointed a knight of the Order of Tahiti Nui.

References

1975 births
Living people
People from Tahiti
French Polynesian footballers
Tahitian beach soccer players
Tahiti international footballers
Association football midfielders
A.S. Pirae players
1998 OFC Nations Cup players
2000 OFC Nations Cup players
2002 OFC Nations Cup players
French people of Corsican descent
Recipients of the Order of Tahiti Nui